Tom Niinimäki (born July 25, 1982) is a Finnish professional mixed martial artist who formerly competed in the Featherweight division of the Ultimate Fighting Championship.

Mixed martial arts career

Early career
Niinimäki began training in kickboxing at the age of 15, and mixed martial arts at 19. He made his professional MMA debut in October 2002 in his native Finland.  He assembled an impressive record of 9-2 in the first two years of competition, with all but one of his wins coming by way of submission or TKO.

Beginning in 2005, Niinimäki hit a rough patch where he lost three fights in a row. After one more win in 2007, he retired from competition, saying that he had "lost his fire" to compete.

After a two and a half year hiatus, Niinimäki returned to the sport in February 2010.  Since his return he has been unbeaten and maintained an 11-fight winning streak before signing with the Ultimate Fighting Championship.

Ultimate Fighting Championship
Niinimäki made his promotional debut against Rani Yahya on November 30, 2013 at The Ultimate Fighter 18 Finale. He won the fight via split decision.

Niinimäki was expected to face Thiago Tavares on May 31, 2014 at UFC Fight Night 41.  However, on May 14, Tavares pulled out of the fight due to thigh injury and was replaced by Niklas Bäckström. Niinimäki lost the back-and-forth fight in the first round by submission.

Niinimäki next faced Chas Skelly on August 23, 2014 at UFC Fight Night 49. He lost the fight via submission in the first round.

On November 7, 2014 Niinimäki announced that he had signed a new four-fight contract with UFC.

Niinimäki was expected to face Rony Jason on December 20, 2014 at UFC Fight Night 58. However, Jason pulled out of the bout on December 10 and was replaced by promotional newcomer Renato Moicano. Niinimäki lost the bout via submission in the second round.

On January 27, 2015, MMAFighting.com reported that Niinimäki had been released from his UFC contract along with four other fighters.

Post-UFC career
In late April 2016, Niinimäki was announced as one of the fighters that had signed on with new European promotion European Fighting Challenge.

Personal life
Before moving to Boca Raton, Florida, Niinimäki lived his entire life in Turku, Finland and worked as a bouncer in several nightclubs.

Management and sponsors
In the early 2012, Niinimäki signed a two-year management contract with Authentic Sports Management. After closing the deal, the management rapidly sent Niinimäki to train at Imperial Athletics gym with a mixed martial arts group later known as Blackzilians. In January 2014, Niinimäki moved to Florida to be able to continue training with Blackzilians at Jaco Hybrid Training Center.

In May 2014, online gambling company Unibet announced a sponsor deal with Niinimäki.

Championships and accomplishments

Wrestling
International Federation of Associated Wrestling Styles
2011: 1st place - European Championships Grappling No Gi (155 lbs) 
2011: 3rd place - European Championships Grappling No Gi (165 lbs) 
2010: 3rd place - European Championships Grappling No Gi (155 lbs) 
2010: 1st place - European Championships Combat Grappling (155 lbs)

Mixed martial arts
Cage
Featherweight Champion
TurkuFight
Featherweight Champion
Nordic MMA Awards - MMAviking.com
2013 Fighter of the Year

Mixed martial arts record

|-
|Win
|align=center|22–8–1
|Jonathan Brookins
|Decision (unanimous)
|Euro FC 1
|
|align=center|3
|align=center|5:00
|Espoo, Finland
|
|-
|Loss
|align=center|21–8–1
|Renato Moicano
|Submission (rear-naked choke)
|UFC Fight Night: Machida vs. Dollaway
|
|align=center|2
|align=center|3:30
|Barueri, Brazil
|
|-
| Loss
| align=center| 21–7–1
| Chas Skelly
| Submission (rear-naked choke)
| UFC Fight Night: Henderson vs. dos Anjos
| 
| align=center| 1
| align=center| 2:35
| Tulsa, Oklahoma, United States
| 
|-
|  Loss
| align=center| 21–6–1
| Niklas Bäckström
| Submission (bulldog choke)
| UFC Fight Night: Munoz vs. Mousasi
| 
| align=center| 1
| align=center| 4:15
| Berlin, Germany
| 
|-
| Win
| align=center| 21–5–1
| Rani Yahya
| Decision (split)
| The Ultimate Fighter 18 Finale
| 
| align=center| 3
| align=center| 5:00
| Las Vegas, Nevada, United States
| 
|-
| Win
| align=center| 20–5–1
| Walel Watson
| Submission (kimura)
| Cage 23
| 
| align=center| 2
| align=center| 2:52
| Vantaa, Finland
| 
|-
| Win
| align=center| 19–5–1
| Chase Beebe
| Decision (unanimous)
| Cage 22
| 
| align=center| 3
| align=center| 5:00
| Vantaa, Finland
| 
|-
| Win
| align=center| 18–5–1
| Vladimir Karasiov
| Submission (guillotine choke)
| Cage 20: Northern Storm 2	
| 
| align=center| 1
| align=center| 1:31
| Oulu, Finland
| 
|-
| Win
| align=center| 17–5–1
| Brian Pearman
| Submission (rear-naked choke)
| TFC 23: Fight for the Troops	
| 
| align=center| 2
| align=center| 3:48
| Fort Riley, Kansas, United States
| 
|-
| Win
| align=center| 16–5–1
| Johnny Frachey
| KO (punch)
| Cage 16: 1st Defense	
| 
| align=center| 1
| align=center| 1:09
| Espoo, Finland
| 
|-
| Win
| align=center| 15–5–1
| Sergej Grecicho
| Decision (unanimous)
| Cage 14: All Stars
| 
| align=center| 3
| align=center| 5:00
| Espoo, Finland
| 
|-
| Win
| align=center| 14–5–1
| Dave Hill
| Decision (unanimous)
| TF 2: Champions are Here
| 
| align=center| 3
| align=center| 5:00
| Turku, Finland
| 
|-
| Win
| align=center| 13–5–1
| Ben Boekee
| Submission (kimura)
| Cage 13: Spring Break
| 
| align=center| 1
| align=center| 3:47
| Vantaa, Finland
| 
|-
| Win
| align=center| 12–5–1
| Yunus Evloev
| Submission (kimura)
| TF: Resurrection
| 
| align=center| 1
| align=center| 
| Turku, Finland
| 
|-
| Win
| align=center| 11–5–1
| Lautaro Arborelo
| Submission (rear-naked choke)
| Cage 12: Champions are Born
| 
| align=center| 2
| align=center| 1:26
| Vantaa, Finland
| 
|-
| Win
| align=center| 
| Bogdan Cristea
| Decision (unanimous)
| CW 7: Scotland The Brave
| 
| align=center| 3
| align=center| 5:00
| Glasgow, Scotland
| 
|-
| Loss
| align=center| 9–5–1
| Tristan Yunker
| Submission (rear-naked choke)
| IHC 11: Apocalypse	
| 
| align=center| 1
| align=center| 1:34
| Vantaa, Finland
| 
|-
| Loss
| align=center| 9–4–1
| Hatsu Hioki
| Technical Submission (armbar)
| Shooto 2005: 11/6 in Korakuen Hall
| 
| align=center| 1
| align=center| 3:03
| Tokyo,  Japan
| 
|-
| Loss
| align=center| 9–3–1
| Danny Batten
| Decision (majority)
| CWFC: Strike Force 2
| 
| align=center| 5
| align=center| 5:00
| Coventry, England
| 
|-
| Draw
| align=center| 9–2–1
| Bendy Casimir
| Draw
| Shooto Sweden: Second Impact
| 
| align=center| 2
| align=center| 5:00
| Stockholm, Sweden
| 
|-
| Win
| align=center| 9–2
| Andre Soares
| Decision (unanimous)
| Cage Warriors 9: Xtreme Xmas
| 
| align=center| 3
| align=center| 5:00
| Sheffield, England
| 
|-
| Win
| align=center| 8–2
| Patrick Rahael
| TKO
| FF 8: FinnFight 8
| 
| align=center| 
| align=center| 
| Turku, Finland
| 
|-
| Win
| align=center| 7–2
| Vincent Latoel
| TKO
| Shooto Finland: Ragnarok
| 
| align=center| 2
| align=center| 2:25
| Tampere, Finland
| 
|-
| Win
| align=center| 6–2
| Carlos Carrasco
| Submission (rear-naked choke)
| Shooto: Switzerland 2
| 
| align=center| 1
| align=center| 
| Zurich, Switzerland
| 
|-
| Win
| align=center| 5–2
| Vincent Latoel
| Submission (triangle Choke)
| Shooto Finland: Capital Punishment 2
| 
| align=center| 2
| align=center| 2:03
| Helsinki, Finland
| 
|-
| Win
| align=center| 4–2
| Ville Honkala
| TKO 
| FF 7: FinnFight 7
| 
| align=center| 1
| align=center| 8:39
| Turku, Finland
| 
|-
| Win
| align=center| 3–2
| Teemu Nurkkala
| TKO (injury) 
| FF 7: FinnFight 7
| 
| align=center| 1
| align=center| 0:15
| Turku, Finland
| 
|-
| Loss
| align=center| 2–2
| Mikael Lahdesmaki
| Decision (unanimous)
| Shooto Finland: Capital Punishment
| 
| align=center| 2
| align=center| 5:00
| Helsinki, Finland
| 
|-
| Loss
| align=center| 2–1
| Per Eklund
| TKO (punches)
| FF 6: FinnFight 6
| 
| align=center| 1
| align=center| 3:53
| Turku, Finland
| 
|-
| Win
| align=center| 2–0
| Janne Salminen
| KO (knees)
| FF 6: FinnFight 6
| 
| align=center| 1
| align=center| 0:32
| Turku, Finland
| 
|-
| Win
| align=center| 1–0
| Mikael Lahdesmaki
| TKO (corner stoppage)
| Shooto Finland: The First Time
| 
| align=center| 1
| align=center| 5:00
| Turku, Finland
|

References

External links

Facebook page
Tom Niinimäki on Twitter
UFC Profile
Fight Matrix Ranking
Profile on Sherdog

1982 births
Living people
Featherweight mixed martial artists
Mixed martial artists utilizing boxing
Mixed martial artists utilizing wrestling
Mixed martial artists utilizing Brazilian jiu-jitsu
Finnish male mixed martial artists
Finnish practitioners of Brazilian jiu-jitsu
Finnish submission wrestlers
Finnish male sport wrestlers
Sportspeople from Turku
Ultimate Fighting Championship male fighters